Ante Miše (born 14 June 1967) is a Croatian football manager and former professional football player who played as a midfielder. 

As a player, he earned 7 caps in friendlies for Croatia in the period from 1992 to 1994.

Playing career

Club
In the 1980s and 90s spent most of his career at Hajduk Split. During his playing career with Hajduk he won the Yugoslav cup, three Croatian titles and three Croatian cups. He started his football career in NK Borovo and also played for Vitesse Arnhem in the Netherlands and Mura Murska Sobota in Slovenia.

International
He made his debut for Croatia in a July 1992 friendly match away against Australia and earned a total of 7 caps, scoring no goals. His final international was an April 1994 friendly away against Slovakia.

Managerial career
After retirement he started coaching and after spending a few seasons coaching lower level sides became Goran Vučević's assistant at Hajduk in the 2008–09 season. Following Vučević's resignation in October 2008, he was appointed caretaker manager at the club and Hajduk immediately improved performance, with Hajduk winning in all of their next six league fixtures which saw them rise to second place just 1 point behind their fierce rivals Dinamo Zagreb at the winter break. He was sacked as manager at Hajduk Split on 3 August 2009, one day after a 1–0 defeat at home to NK Zadar in their second league match of the 2009–10 season.

In May 2010, he was appointed new manager at Istra 1961 in the Croatian first division. However, after losing the opening two matches of the 2010–11 league season (6–1 at Hajduk Split and 2–0 at home to NK Zagreb), he was sacked on 3 August 2010 and replaced by Robert Jarni the following day.

From November 2013 until June 2014, and from September 2014 to April 2015, Miše managed Bosnian Premier League Vitez. In September 2015, he became an assistant coach of the Croatia national team in the staff of head coach Ante Čačić.

From June to August 2018, Miše managed another Bosnian Premier League club, Zrinjski Mostar.

Turkmenistan
In March 2019, the Football Federation of Turkmenistan named Miše as the head coach of the Turkmenistan national football team, signing a one-year contract. Croatian specialist Sandro Tomić will help to train the national team of Turkmenistan. Croatian coaches are set to develop the overall football in Turkmenistan, not just the national team.  His first game, 3-month later, was a 0–0 draw at friendly match with Uganda.

In March 2020, due to the expiration of the contract and the postponement of matches of the 2022 FIFA World Cup qualification in Asia, left from Turkmenistan with goalkeeper coach Sandro Tomic. The national team of Turkmenistan, playing in the qualifying tournament of the World Cup 2022, took first place in the group at the time of his departure for the first time ever.

Al-Arabi SC
In December of 2020, Miše was named manager of Al-Arabi Sporting Club. In his first season, he led the team to win the Kuwait Premier League for the first time in 19 years in the 2020–21 season without any loss. In the following season, he won the 2021 Kuwait Super Cup which was played in February 2022 against Kuwait SC, and won the Kuwait Crown Prince Cup 2021–22.

Al-Faisaly
On 12 July 2022, Miše was appointed as manager of Saudi Arabian club Al-Faisaly. On 19 January 2023, Miše was sacked. He was assisted by Ardian Kozniku at both Arabi and Faisaly.

Managerial statistics

Personal life
In addition of his Croatian, Ante also learned to speak English and Russian when he coached Turkmenistan.

Honours

Player
Hajduk Split
1. HNL: 1992, 1993–94, 2000–01
Yugoslav Cup: 1990–91
Croatian Cup: 1992–93, 1999–2000, 2002–03

Individual
Awards
Heart of Hajduk Award: 1994

Coach 
 Al-Arabi SC (Kuwait)
 Kuwait Premier League: 2020–21
 Kuwait Emir Cup: 2020–21 
 Kuwait Crown Prince Cup: 2021–22
 Kuwait Super Cup: 2021

References

External links
 
Ante Miše Croatia stats at the Croatian Football Federation website 

1967 births
Living people
Sportspeople from Vukovar
Association football midfielders
Yugoslav footballers
Croatian footballers
Croatia international footballers
HNK Hajduk Split players
FK Borac Banja Luka players
SBV Vitesse players
NK Mura players
Yugoslav First League players
Croatian Football League players
Eredivisie players
Slovenian PrvaLiga players
Croatian expatriate footballers
Expatriate footballers in the Netherlands
Croatian expatriate sportspeople in the Netherlands
Expatriate footballers in Slovenia
Croatian expatriate sportspeople in Slovenia
Croatian football managers
NK Dugopolje managers
NK Mosor managers
HNK Trogir managers
HNK Hajduk Split managers
NK Istra 1961 managers
NK Vitez managers
HŠK Zrinjski managers
Turkmenistan national football team managers
Al-Arabi SC (Kuwait) managers
Al-Faisaly FC managers
Croatian Football League managers
Premier League of Bosnia and Herzegovina managers
Kuwait Premier League managers
Saudi First Division League managers
Croatian expatriate football managers
Expatriate football managers in Bosnia and Herzegovina
Croatian expatriate sportspeople in Bosnia and Herzegovina
Expatriate football managers in Turkmenistan
Croatian expatriate sportspeople in Turkmenistan
Expatriate football managers in Kuwait
Croatian expatriate sportspeople in Kuwait
Expatriate football managers in Saudi Arabia
Croatian expatriate sportspeople in Saudi Arabia